is the sixth single by Japanese girl group NMB48.

Members

"Kitagawa Kenji" 
 Team N: Mayu Ogasawara, Kanako Kadowaki, Rika Kishino, Riho Kotani, Kei Jonishi, Miru Shiroma, Aina Fukumoto, Nana Yamada, Sayaka Yamamoto, Akari Yoshida, Miyuki Watanabe
 Team M: Airi Tanigawa, Fuuko Yagura
 Team BII: Yuuka Katou, Shu Yabushita
 Team A/Unknown: Yui Yokoyama

"Hoshizora no Caravan" 
Shirogumi
 Team N: Mayu Ogasawara, Rina Kondo, Sayaka Yamamoto, Akari Yoshida
 Team M: Yuki Azuma, Ayaka Okita, Momoka Kinoshita, Yui Takano
 Team BII: Hono Akazawa, Tsubasa Yamauchi
 Kenkyūsei: Momoka Hayashi
 Team A/Unknown: Yui Yokoyama

"Renai Higaitodoke" 
Akagumi
 Team N: Haruna Kinoshita, Aina Fukumoto, Yuuki Yamaguchi, Nana Yamada, Miyuki Watanabe 
 Team M: Rena Kawakami, Rena Shimada, Ayame Hikawa, Mao Mita, Fuuko Yagura
 Team BII: Hazuki Kurokawa, Kanako Muro

"Fuyushougun no Regret" 
Namba Teppoudai Ni
 Team N: Shiori Matsuda
 Team M: Fuuko Yagura, Natsumi Yamagishi, Hitomi Yamamoto, Keira Yogi
 Team BII: Yuuka Katou, Rina Kushiro, Shu Yabushita

"In-Goal" 
 Team N: Mayu Ogasawara, Kanako Kadowaki, Rika Kishino, Kei Jonishi, Shiori Matsuda, Sayaka Yamamoto, Akari Yoshida, Miyuki Watanabe
 Team M: Ayaka Okita, Arisa Koyanagi, Airi Tanigawa, Sae Murase, Fuuko Yagura, Natsumi Yamagishi
 Team BII: Emika Kamieda, Rikako Kobayashi

"Nemuku Naru made Hitsuji wa Detekonai" 
Undergirls
 Team N: Kanna Shinohara
 Team M: Riona Ota, Ayaka Murakami
 Team BII: Akari Ishizuka, Anna Ijiri, Mirei Ueda, Mako Umehara, Yuuri Ota, Konomi Kusaka, Saki Kono
 Kenkyuusei: Yuumi Ishida, Mizuki Uno, Narumi Koga, Sorai Sato, Kano Sugimoto, Riko Takayama, Sora Togo, Hiromi Nakagawa, Rurina Nishizawa, Riko Hisada, Arisa Miura

Oricon Charts

References

2012 singles
Japanese-language songs
Songs with lyrics by Yasushi Akimoto
NMB48 songs
Oricon Weekly number-one singles
Billboard Japan Hot 100 number-one singles
2012 songs